Joseph Anthony Pagliei (born April 12, 1934) is a former American football player who played with the Philadelphia Eagles and New York Titans. He played college football at Clemson University. He also played in the Canadian Football League for the Calgary Stampeders.

References

Further reading
Where Are They Now: Joe Pagliei
Joe Pagliei, Ken Safarowic, Joe Pagliei: The Roast Master, 2017 

1934 births
Living people
American football fullbacks
Clemson Tigers football players
Philadelphia Eagles players
New York Titans (AFL) players
Players of American football from Pennsylvania
People from Clairton, Pennsylvania